SS. Cyril and Methodius Parish
 SS. Cyril and Methodius Parish, Hartford
 SS. Cyril and Methodius Parish (Bridgeport, Connecticut)